Baird High School is a public high school located in Baird, Texas (USA) and classified as a 1A school by the UIL. It is part of the Baird Independent School District located in central Callahan County. In 2015 the school was rated "Met Standard" by the Texas Education Agency.

Athletics
The Baird Bears compete in these sports:

Baseball
Basketball
Cross Country
Football
Golf
Softball
Tennis
Track and Field

State Titles
Girls Basketball
1964(1A)
Boys Golf
1988(1A), 1989(1A), 1994(1A), 1996(1A)
Girls Golf
1997(1A), 1998(1A), 1999(1A), 2000(1A), 2001(1A), 2002(1A), 2004(1A), 2005(1A), 2009(1A), 2010(1A), 2011(1A)

References

External links
Baird ISD

Schools in Callahan County, Texas
Public high schools in Texas